Jennifer Sciole (born April 28, 1979) is an American actress.

Life and career
Sciole was born in Philadelphia, Pennsylvania, the youngest of six children raised in an Italian family. Her first acting job was in a local grocery store commercial at the age of fifteen.

After high school she attended St. Joseph's University in Philadelphia, where she majored in psychology, later switching to business management.

After college Sciole  started a software company, then returned to acting full-time. She moved to Los Angeles in 2005, where she worked as an extra and studied with acting coaches including Bernard Hiller, John Homa and Nathan Reid.

She also volunteered for Last Chance for Animals.

Filmography

External links

 
 Jennifer Sciole's Myspace Page

American actresses
1979 births
Living people
21st-century American women
Apple Inc. employees